Humming by the Flowered Vine is the third album by Laura Cantrell, originally released in 2005.  This album was chosen as one of Amazon.com's Top 100 Editor's Picks of 2005. The song "Bees" is dedicated to the memory of John Peel, who was a great supporter of the artist.

Track listing
All tracks composed by Laura Cantrell; except where noted.
"14th Street" (Emily Spray) – 3:19
"What You Said" (Jenifer Jackson) – 2:55
"And Still" (Dave Schramm) – 3:59
"Khaki & Corduroy" – 4:30
"Letters" (Lucinda Williams) – 4:54
"California Rose" – 2:54
"Wishful Thinking" (Wynn Stewart) – 2:55
"Poor Ellen Smith" (Traditional; arranged by Laura Cantrell) – 4:02
"Bees" (Laura Cantrell, Jay Sherman-Godfrey) – 4:12
"Old Downtown" – 6:12

Personnel
Laura Cantrell - vocals, acoustic guitar
Dave Schramm
Joey Burns
John Convertino
Kenny Kosek
Mark Spencer
Amy Helm
Paul Niehaus
Steve Goulding
Ted Reichman
Mary Lee Kortes
Jon Graboff
Jeremy Chatzky
Fiona McBain
Patrick Matera
JD Foster

References

2005 albums
Laura Cantrell albums
Matador Records albums